Reaville is an unincorporated community located along the border of East Amwell and Raritan townships in Hunterdon County, New Jersey. By the 1830s, it was known as Greenville. It was later renamed after Runkle Rea, the first postmaster in 1850.

History
In the 18th century, Reaville was a stop on the stagecoach route along the Old York Road. A school had been located in Reaville.  By 1881, a harness shop was the only business located there.

Historic district

The Reaville Historic District is a  historic district encompassing the community along Old York, Amwell, Barley Sheaf, Kuhl, and Manners roads. It was added to the National Register of Historic Places on May 2, 2002 for its significance in architecture, commerce, and community development. The district includes 32 contributing buildings.

The Reaville Church, formerly known as the First English Presbyterian Church, was built in 1839 and remodeled in 1883. It features Federal architecture with Greek Revival influences. The Amwell Presbyterian Church Parsonage was built in 1865 with Gothic Revival influences and features a diamond-shaped window with quatrefoil tracery.

Transportation
County Route 514 enters the community along Old York Road from Ringoes and leaves along Amwell Road toward Neshanic.

See also
 National Register of Historic Places listings in Hunterdon County, New Jersey

References

External links
 
 
 

Raritan Township, New Jersey
East Amwell Township, New Jersey
Unincorporated communities in Hunterdon County, New Jersey
Unincorporated communities in New Jersey